Rustler Yachts is a British yachtbuilder based in Falmouth, Cornwall, with a reputation for handbuilding high quality, semi-custom yachts. The yachts are primarily cruising-orientated designs, built from glassfibre composite, with traditional hull forms and heavily built construction.

The origins of Rustler are in the mid-1960s, when Kim Holman designed the Rustler 31 for Russell Anstey of Poole (hence the name Rustler, a play on Russell).   Russell started Anstey Yachts and built the first thirty five or so.  The molds were then sold on and she was built by various companies.  In the early 1980s, Orion Marine and its founder Ralph Hogg began building the traditional Rustler 36 design.

The  Rustler 42, launched in 1999, was the first in the new direction for Rustler. Designed by Stephen Jones, designer of the Starlight 35,and Starlight 39, the Rustler 42 was seen as the quintessential bluewater cruiser. She marked the start of an ongoing relationship with Stephen Jones (now having designed its 33, 37, 42, 44, and most recently the 57) In 2005 Rustler moved to a newly built waterside factory in Penryn. Rustler also built yachts under the Bowman brand since the acquisition of Rival Bowman in 2002, and until 2011 also produced yachts under the Starlight brand.

In 2007, Rustler introduced the Rustler 44, an elongated, taller version of the Rustler 42, with a raised deck saloon.

In 2009, the first daysailer was introduced, the Rustler 24, followed by the Rustler 33 in 2011.

In 2014, the modern replacement for the long-keel Ruster 36 was introduced. Although the Rustler 36 is still available, the Rustler 37 offers increased hull volume and an encapsulated long fin keel, instead of the long keel on the Kim Holman design.

Its largest yachts to date is the Rustler 57, launched in 2019 (2021)

Range
Rustler 24
Rustler 33
Rustler 36
Rustler 37
Rustler 42
Rustler 44
Rustler 57

See also
Bowman Yachts
List of sailboat designers and manufacturers

References

External links
Rustler Yachts homepage
Rustler range

Yacht building companies
British boat builders
British brands
Manufacturing companies of England
Companies based in Cornwall
British companies established in 2000
Vehicle manufacturing companies established in 2000
2000 establishments in England
Falmouth, Cornwall